Tomasz Dietl (born 1 October 1950) is a Polish physicist, a professor and a head of Laboratory for Cryogenic and Spintronic Research at the Institute of Physics, Polish Academy of Sciences and professor of The Institute of Theoretical Physics at University of Warsaw. His research interest includes semiconductors, spintronics and nanotechnology. With over 20,000 citations he is considered one of the leading Polish physicists.

Career
He graduated from the University of Warsaw at the age of 23 (master's degree) and subsequently obtained his PhD from the Polish Academy of Sciences in 1977. He obtained a habilitation in 1983 and the title of professor in 1990. Since then he has been working in the Institute of Physics of the Polish Academy of Sciences. In 2009, he became a member of the Polish Academy of Learning (PAU) as well as the Warsaw Scientific Society (WTN). He worked as a visiting professor at the Johannes Kepler University Linz (1991–92, 1996–98), Joseph Fourier University (1993-2000) and Tohoku University.

In 2006, he received Poland's top science award, Prize of the Foundation for Polish Science, "for developing the theory, confirmed in recent years, of diluted ferromagnetic semiconductors, and for demonstrating new methods in controlling magnetization."

Personal life

He is the son of economist Jerzy Dietl. He is married and has two children.

Honours and awards
 Gold Cross of Merit (1990) 
 Maria Skłdowska-Curie Award of the Polish Academy of Sciences (1997)
 Alexander von Humboldt Research Award (2003)
 Fellow of the Institute of Physics, UK (2004)
 Europhysics Prize (with Hideo Ohno and David Awschalom), European Physical Society (2005)
 Prize of the Foundation for Polish Science (2006)
 Marian Smoluchowski Medal of the Polish Physical Society (2010)
 Member of Academia Europaea (2011)
 Commander's Cross of the Order of Polonia Restituta, (2013)
 Fellow of the American Physical Society (2015)

Most influential publications

 Dietl T., Ohno H., Matsukura F., Cibert J., Ferrand D., Zener Model Description of Ferromagnetism in Zinc-Blende Magnetic Semiconductors, Science (2000)

See also
Science in Poland

References

External links
 Some information about Dietl - Foundation for Polish Science webpage
 Professor Dietl's homepage

1950 births
Living people
20th-century Polish physicists
Members of the Polish Academy of Sciences
21st-century Polish physicists
Fellows of the American Physical Society